Minnesota State Highway 55 (MN 55) is a highway in west-central, central, and east-central Minnesota, which runs from the North Dakota state line near Tenney and continues east and southeast to its eastern terminus at its intersection with U.S. Highway 61 in Hastings.

This route, signed east–west, runs roughly diagonally across the central part of Minnesota.

Route description
Highway 55 serves as a northwest–southeast route between Elbow Lake, Glenwood, Paynesville, Annandale, Buffalo, Plymouth, Minneapolis, Mendota Heights, and Hastings.

Highway 55 begins at the Bois de Sioux River, at the Minnesota — North Dakota state line near Tenney.  North Dakota Highway 11 is its counterpoint upon crossing the state line.  Highway 55 continues east to Tenney, Nashua, and Wendell.  The route has a junction with U.S. Highway 59 before entering the city of Elbow Lake.  Highways 55 and 59 run concurrently for 11 miles until reaching Barrett.

Highway 55 then continues independently again to Hoffman, Kensington, Farwell, and Lowry before reaching the city of Glenwood.  At Glenwood, Highway 55 has an intersection with State Highway 29 and an interchange with State Highway 28.

The route continues southeast to Sedan and Brooten before reaching its junction with U.S. Highway 71 in Belgrade.  Highway 55 passes through Regal before reaching its junction with State Highways 4 and 23 at the city of Paynesville.

Highway 55 continues east to Eden Valley and Watkins before reaching its junction with State Highway 15 at Kimball.

The route has a junction with State Highway 24 in Annandale.  Highway 55 continues to Maple Lake and then Buffalo, where it has a junction with State Highway 25.

Highway 55 enters the Twin Cities area at Rockford and Greenfield, continuing east to Medina and Plymouth.  Highway 55 has a junction with I-494 in Plymouth.  Highway 55 continues east and has a junction with U.S. Highway 169 at the Plymouth / Golden Valley boundary line.  Highway 55 continues through Golden Valley to its junction with State Highway 100.  The route then continues east and enters the city of Minneapolis.

The highway has been designated Olson Memorial Highway, named for Floyd B. Olson, a popular Minnesota governor of Norwegian ancestry. Olson grew up in North Minneapolis, near where the highway runs. While the entire route is designated as the Olson Memorial Highway, it is only consistently signed as such between Interstate 494 and N 7th Street in Minneapolis. The part of Highway 55 southeast of downtown is known as Hiawatha Avenue.  Light rail trains on the Blue Line, and Little Earth Trail and Hiawatha LRT Trail for bicyclists/pedestrians, run parallel to the highway for much of the Hiawatha Avenue stretch.

 In July 2005, the section of Highway 55 that runs through downtown Minneapolis was turned back to local maintenance. To fill the gap, Highway 55 was rerouted along Interstate 94 Westbound/US Highway 52 Northbound. MN 55 now exits just before downtown at the westbound I-94/Northbound US 52 exit, and leaves the concurrency at the exit for the Olson Highway, marked with the Highway 55 shield. Eastbound, 55 leaves the Olson Highway at the interchange for I-94 eastbound/US 52 southbound, and leaves the freeway at the exit for Hiawatha Avenue, which is also marked with the Highway 55 shield.

There has been some controversy with expansion of the highway. An area known as Camp Coldwater, considered by some as the "birthplace of Minnesota," was dug up during some construction.  Highway 55 joins with State Highway 62 at this point.

Fort Snelling State Park is located near the junction of Highway 55 and State Highway 5. The park entrance is located on Highway 5 at Post Road.
 
Highway 55 crosses the Minnesota River via the Mendota Bridge, which was the longest continuous bridge made of poured concrete when it was completed in 1926.

The route enters Mendota Heights, diverges from Highway 62, and then has a junction with State Highway 13.

Highway 55 continues southeast through Eagan, joining briefly with State Highway 149.  The route then has a junction with State Highway 3 in Inver Grove Heights.  Highway 55 then runs concurrent with U.S. Highway 52 through Inver Grove Heights and into Rosemount.  At Rosemount, Highway 55 leaves U.S. 52.  Highway 55 continues independently again to its eastern terminus at its intersection with U.S. Highway 61 in the city of Hastings.

History

Highway 55 was authorized in 1933. 

The original alignment for Highway 55 in Minneapolis was along old U.S. Highway 52 (now Hennepin CSAH 81) to Rockford Road, then Rockford Road to MN 55's present-day alignment (now Hennepin CSAH 9). The present-day alignment was constructed in the early 1950s.

Major intersections

References

055
Streets in Minneapolis
Transportation in Wilkin County, Minnesota
Transportation in Grant County, Minnesota
Transportation in Pope County, Minnesota
Transportation in Stearns County, Minnesota
Transportation in Kandiyohi County, Minnesota
Transportation in Meeker County, Minnesota
Transportation in Wright County, Minnesota
Transportation in Hennepin County, Minnesota
Transportation in Dakota County, Minnesota
U.S. Route 52